In geometry, a conchoid is a curve derived from a fixed point , another curve, and a length . It was invented by the ancient Greek mathematician Nicomedes.

Description
The conchoid is, therefore, the cissoid of the given curve and a circle of radius  and center . They are called conchoids because the shape of their outer branches resembles conch shells.

If 

expresses the given curve, then 

expresses the conchoid. 

If the curve is a line, then the conchoid is the conchoid of Nicomedes.

A limaçon is a conchoid with a circle as the given curve.

The so-called conchoid of de Sluze and conchoid of Dürer are not actually conchoids. The former is a strict cissoid and the latter a construction more general yet.

See also
Cissoid
Strophoid

References

External links

conchoid with conic sections - interactive illustration
 
 conchoid at mathcurves.com

Plane curves